Ahez is a French vocal group from Carhaix, Brittany, consisting of Marine Lavigne, Sterenn Diridollou and Sterenn Le Guillou. The trio represented France in the Eurovision Song Contest 2022 together with Alvan with the song "Fulenn".

History 
Diridollou, Lavigne and Le Guillou met during their studies at Diwan secondary school in Carhaix, Brittany, where they practised the traditional singing style kan ha diskan. The group started performing at fest-noz festivals in 2018, and took part in the 2018 edition of the Inter-Celtic Festival of Lorient with the band Eben.

In the summer of 2021, they met singer and producer Alvan in a bar in Rennes. Together, they participated in Eurovision France, c'est vous qui décidez ! 2022 ("Eurovision France, you decide ! 2022"), the French national selection for the Eurovision Song Contest 2022, with the song "Fulenn". They went on to win the competition, winning both the jury vote and televote. "Fulenn" was the first Eurovision entry to be sung in Breton since .

Discography

Singles

References

External links 
 

Musical groups established in 2018
Vocal trios
French musical trios
Breton musical groups
Breton-language singers
Celtic fusion groups
Eurovision Song Contest entrants of 2022
Eurovision Song Contest entrants for France